Burning in the Wind is a 2002 Italian-Swiss romance-drama film written and directed  by Silvio Soldini. It is based on the Agota Kristof's short novel Hier.

It was entered into the main competition at the 52nd Berlin International Film Festival.  For this film Luca Bigazzi won the Nastro d'Argento for best cinematography and the Globo d'oro in the same category.

Cast 
 Ivan Franek as Tobias
 Barbora Lukesová as Line
 Ctirad Götz as Janek
 Caroline Baehr as Yolanda
 Cécile Pallas as Eve
 Petr Forman as Pavel
 Zuzana Mauréry as Katy

References

External links

Italian romantic drama films
2002 romantic drama films
2002 films
Films directed by Silvio Soldini
Films about immigration
Swiss drama films
2000s Italian films